Cyrtodactylus cracens is a species of gecko endemic to island of Sri Lanka.

Habitat and distribution
Cyrtodactylus cracens is known from and around the Sinharaja Forest Reserve.

Description
Cyrtodactylus cracens can grow to a snout–vent length of at least . Dorsal tubercles are flattened, and claws long. Scales under fourth toe 7–10. Mental subtriangular, midbody scale rows 26–32. About 6–8 rows of dorsal tubercles at midbody. Scales on venter imbricate to subimbricate, with rounded posterior edges. A single series of 5 pre-anal pores in a shallow pre-cloacal depression.

Ecology and diet
Inhabits small, cave-like rocky areas adjoining forest streams as well as tree trunks in forests and a cardamon plantation (former C. subsolanus).

References

Cyrtodactylus
Reptiles of Sri Lanka
Endemic fauna of Sri Lanka
Reptiles described in 2005